Siegfried Schnabl (27 February 1927 – 4 August 2015) was a German sexologist and psychotherapist who contributed to the work of sex education in East Germany and other nations. He was born in Limbach, Sachsen.

Works
 Untersuchungen typologischer und allgemeiner Besonderheiten der höheren Nerventätigkeit des Menschen mit einer Komplexmethode. (English: Studies and general typological characteristics of higher nervous activity of man with a complex method) Dissertation, University of Leipzig, 1955
 Einführung in die Psychopathologie. (English: Introduction to Psychopathology) Potsdam: Institut für Weiterbildung Mittlerer Medizinischer Fachkräfte 1967 (Lesson)
 Mann und Frau intim. Fragen des gesunden und des gestörten Geschlechtslebens. (English: Man and Woman, Intimately: Issues of Healthy and Unhealthy Sex Life) Rudolstadt: Greifenverlag, 1 August 1969 (with illustrations by Helmut Fliege) 18 August 1990 
 Mann und Frau intim. Gesundes Geschlechtsleben, gestörtes Geschlechtsleben. (English: Man and Woman, Intimately: Healthy Sex Life and Unhealthy Sex Life) (slightly abridged edition license for the Federal Republic of Germany) Gütersloh: Bertelsmann guide publication, 1 August 1969 (with illustrations by Horst and Gisela Keuer. Sex Positions: Horst Günther)
 Muž a žena intímne. Otázky zdravého a narušeného pohlavného života. (English: Man and Woman, Intimately: Issues of Healthy and Unhealthy Sex Life) Martin: Publishing house Osveta, 1 August 1972 (Slovakian)
 Мъжаът и жената интимно. Проблеми на нормалния и смутения полов живот. (English: Man and Woman, Intimately: Issues of Healthy and Unhealthy Sex Life)  Sofia: Medicine and Sports (Медицина и Физкултура), 1 August 1979 (Bulgarian)
 El hombre y la mujer en la intimidad. (English: Man and Woman, Intimately) Havanna: Editorial Científico-Técnica, 1979 (Spanish)
 Мужчина и женщина: интимные отношения. (English: Man and Woman: Intimate relationships) Kischinjow: Publishing house Stiinca (Стиинца) 1982 (Russian)
 O homem e a mulher na intimidade. Questões da vida sexual. (English: Man and Woman, Intimately: Issues of Sex Life) Lissabon: Editorial Caminho, 1983 (Portuguese)
 Seksologijos pagrindai. (English: Basic Sexology) Vilnius: Science 1990 (Lithuanian) 
 Die Lust des Liebens. Frau und Mann intim. (English: The Joy of Love: Man and Woman, Intimately) Frankfurt am Main: published by Ullstein Verlag in paperback, 1992, (completely revised and enlarged edition) 
 Barbatul şi femeia. Relaţii intime. (English: Men and Women: Intimate Relationships) Chișinău: EUS 1993 (Romanian) 
 Intimverhalten, Sexualstörungen, Persönlichkeit. (English: Intimate Behavior, Sexual Disorders, Personality.) Habilitation, University of Leipzig, 1972, (As a book) Berlin, Publicly Owned Operation German Academic Publishers, 1972
 Comportamento sessuale e personalità. (English: Sexual Behavior and Personality) Milan: Teti (circa 1976) (Italian)
 Nervös? Ursachen, Erscheinungsformen, Vorbeugen u. Überwindung psychosozialer Gesundheitsstörungen. (English: Are you Nervous? Causes, Symptoms, Prevention and Overcoming of Psychosocial Health Problems) Berlin, Volkseigener Betrieb, published in People and Health, 1 August 1975
 Нервен ли сте? (English: Are you Nervous?) Sofia: Medicine and Sports (Медицина и Физкултура), 1 August 1984 (Bulgarian)
 Nervioso? (English: Are you Nervous?) Havanna: Editorial Científico-Técnica, 1985 (Spanish)
 Plädoyer für die Liebe. (English: Plea for Love) Leipzig/Jena/Berlin: Urania-Verlag, 2 August 1978
 Разговор за любовта. (English: Talking about Love) Sofia: Medicine and Sports (Медицина и Физкултура), 1 August 1982 (Bulgarian)
 En defensa del amor. (English: In Defense of Love) Havanna: Editorial Científico-Técnica, 2 August 1985 (Spanish)
 Der Liebe Lust, der Liebe Leid. (English: The Joy of Love, The Pain of Love) Berlin: Berliner Verlag 1987 
 100 Fragen zu Sex und Liebe. (English: 100 Questions about Sex and Love) Frankfurt am Main: published by Ullstein Verlag in paperback, 1994

Further reading
 Christoph Links: Schnabl, Siegfried . In: Wer war wer in der DDR? 5th issue. Volume 2. Chapter Links, Berlin 2010, .

References

External links
 
 Jens Bisky: Wehe, wenn die Betten quietschen. Süddeutsche Zeitung, 27 February 2007

German sexologists
Sex education
1927 births
2015 deaths
People from Limbach-Oberfrohna
East German physicians